Wolters Filling Station is a historic building located in the West End of Davenport, Iowa, United States. Alfred Wolters built this building to house his filling station in 1930. His son, Dick Wolters, took over the business and operated it as a Standard franchise. The gas pumps were eventually removed and it has been used for other commercial enterprises, including a hair salon.

The station was built in an English Cottage style. It features polychrome brick, metal casement windows, a stone-arched doorway, half-timbered gables, and rustic posts and bracings on the drive-thru. The domestic character of the building was typical for filling stations built in the same era. The filling station was listed on the National Register of Historic Places in 1984.

References

Transport infrastructure completed in 1930
Buildings and structures in Davenport, Iowa
Gas stations on the National Register of Historic Places in Iowa
National Register of Historic Places in Davenport, Iowa